The Boy in the Dress may refer to:

 The Boy in the Dress (novel), a 2008 novel by David Walliams
 The Boy in the Dress, a 2014 film based on the novel
 The Boy in the Dress (musical), a 2019 musical based on the novel